Goodfellas is the second studio album by American hip hop duo Showbiz and A.G. It was released on May 30, 1995, via Payday/FFRR Records. Recording sessions took place at Chung King Studios in New York and at BlackHole Studios in Hampton. Production was handled by Showbiz, Lord Finesse, DJ Premier, Roc Raida and Dres. It features guest appearances from Wali World, the Ghetto Dwellas, Diamond D, Lord Finesse and Method Man. It spawned an underground hit "Next Level (Nyte Time Mix)", which later was included in 2002 film 8 Mile. The music video for Next Level was filmed primarily in the Brooklyn Bridge Park for shots under the Brooklyn Bridge and at the Manhattan Municipal Building. The exterior shots at the building were in front of the surface entrance to the Chambers Street subway station while the interior shots were filmed in lobby 31.

Track listing

Personnel
Andre "A.G." Barnes – vocals (tracks: 1-3, 7-14)
Rodney "Showbiz" LeMay – producer (tracks: 1-3, 7-14)
Big Cathy – additional vocals (track 2)
Arthur "Party Arty" Sheridan – vocals (tracks: 3, 7, 8), additional vocals (track 14)
Damon "D. Flow" Graham – vocals (tracks: 4, 7)
Robert "Lord Finesse" Hall, Jr. – vocals, producer (track 4)
Christopher "DJ Premier" Martin – producer (track 5)
Anthony "Roc Raida" Williams – producer (track 6), scratches (track 13)
Andre "Dres" Titus – producer (track 7)
Wali "Wally World" Burgos – vocals (tracks: 7, 12)
Clifford "Method Man" Smith – vocals (track 7)
DeShawn "Sunkiss" Barzey – additional vocals (track 10)
Joseph "Diamond D" Kirkland – vocals (track 14)
Chris Conway – engineering & mixing (tracks: 1, 2, 4-10, 12-14)
Gordon Williams – engineering & mixing (tracks: 3, 11)
Brian Miller – assistant engineering
Jeff King – assistant engineering
John Y. – assistant engineering
Tony Dawsey – mastering
Miguel Rivera – design

Charts

Singles

References

External links

1995 albums
FFRR Records albums
Showbiz and A.G. albums
Albums produced by DJ Premier
Albums produced by Lord Finesse
Albums produced by Showbiz (producer)